Barbuda-South or Barbuda South River Road, is a village and enumeration district on the island of Barbuda.

Demographics 
Barbuda-South has one enumeration district, ED 90400 (Barbuda-South). Before the 2011 census, it was enumeration district 90500.

Census Data (2011)

References 

Populated places in Antigua and Barbuda
Major Division of Rest of Barbuda